Grant Township, Nebraska may refer to the following places:

Grant Township, Antelope County, Nebraska
Grant Township, Buffalo County, Nebraska
Grant Township, Cuming County, Nebraska
Grant Township, Custer County, Nebraska
Grant Township, Gage County, Nebraska
Grant Township, Kearney County, Nebraska

See also
Grant  Township (disambiguation)
Nebraska township disambiguation pages